Stella Does Tricks is a 1996 film about a young Glaswegian girl, played by Kelly Macdonald, working as a prostitute in London.

The film was the first feature film directed by Coky Giedroyc, inspired by her previous work making documentaries about homeless people in Glasgow, Manchester, and London, and provided Macdonald with her first film role after Trainspotting. The film has been described as "an uncompromisingly feminist text, in which the Baby Doll turns Avenger", and by Lawrence van Gelder of The New York Times as a "bleak, perceptive portrait of the prostitute as a young girl torn between the need for genuine love and a career of sexual exploitation".

Despite the film centering on the lives of female prostitutes, the only nudity in the film is male nudity.

The screenplay was written by the novelist A. L. Kennedy, and draws in part on one of her earlier stories, Friday Payday. Cinematography was by frequent Ken Loach collaborator Barry Ackroyd.

Plot
Stella is one of a number of young prostitutes working for the pimp Mr. Peters in London, having run away from her Glasgow home where she was sexually abused by her father, a stand-up comedian. She tries to get away from Peters and becomes involved with Eddie, a heroin addict, before taking her revenge on Peters and her father.

Cast
Kelly Macdonald as Stella
James Bolam as Mr. Peters
Hans Matheson as Eddie
Ewan Stewart as Francis
Andy Serkis as Fitz

External links

References

British drama films
1996 films
1996 drama films
Films about prostitution in the United Kingdom
Incest in film
1990s feminist films
Films set in London
1990s English-language films
1990s British films